High mobility group protein 20A is a protein that in humans is encoded by the HMG20A gene.

References

Further reading

External links